Lexmond is a village in the Dutch province of Utrecht. It is a part of the municipality of Vijfheerenlanden, and lies about 7 km south of IJsselstein.

Lexmond was a separate municipality in the province of South Holland until 1986, when it became part of Zederik. When Zederik merged into the new municipality Vijfheerenlanden in 2019, it became a part of the province of Utrecht.

History 
The village was first mentioned in 1180 as Lakesmunde, and means "mouth of the Laak (river)". Lexmond started as a dike village along the Lek River. In 1277, the Laak was dammed and a little harbour was constructed. The Dutch Reformed Church dates from the 14th century and was extensively restored between 1954 and 1958. In 1840, it was home to 700 people.

Gallery

References

Former municipalities of South Holland
Populated places in Utrecht (province)
Vijfheerenlanden